Harmanjot Singh may refer to:
 Harmanjot Singh (cricketer)
 Harmanjot Singh (footballer)